Phantom is a Russian eight-part television crime series, which premiered on TV-3 on November 23, 2020. It also appeared on StudioCanal from April 2021. Phantom was broadcast from July 15, 2021 on Australian network, SBS-TV's streaming service, On Demand. Filming took place in Moscow from June to October 2019. The action is largely set in that city from late August to mid-September 2020. In the series, the main protagonist, Stas Khabarov (Denis Shvedov) is a police detective, trailing a drug dealer. Stas is murdered by a third person and becomes a phantom to protect his estranged wife, Vera (Evgeniya Brik) from his killer. Stas is assisted by teenage college student, Katya (Angelina Zagrebina), who can see and hear him.

Plot 

Stas hunts a major drug dealer, Gypsy, who distributes a synthetic drug, "Rad". The latest of five deaths in a month was a young woman, Lena. Stas corners Gypsy on a rooftop but is killed by a third person as he turns around. His phantom, heads towards a lit doorway but pauses when he has a vision of Vera being shot by his own murderer. Stas has two weeks to find the killer and protect Vera. Stas' boss, Victor leads the detective squad with other members, Artur, Dima and Ksyu. Vera works for the police in a different section. Her boss, Lyosha, has romantic designs on her. Stas enlists Katya, a first-year Psychology major, to help him. Katya lives with her Aunt Ira while trying to unearth details about her parents' deaths. At college Katya encounters Igor a spoilt, rich man; Dina another first-year student; and Anton, a fellow student and sometime musician.

Stas learns his squad has a mole and suspects each one, in turn. "Rad" distribution is taken over by Dunya. Stas asks Katya to risk her safety first by retrieving Gypsy's phone and later by getting Dunya's contacts list. Stas and Anton help Katya to find her mother, Olya. Vera initially suspects Stas had cheated on her; that he was bribed by drug dealers; and that he fathered a son with a prostitute. Later Vera finds her suspicions were false. Artur buys black market drugs: pain-killers for his ex-wife. Ksyu spied on fellow squad members for Internal Affairs. Dima is arrested after being linked to a human trafficking ring and threatening to kill Vera. Igor is questioned about knowing Lena and buying "Rad" from Gypsy. Next day he is found dead of an overdose. Lyosha stalked Stas and is friends with Igor's mother. Katya's involvement in the investigations results in her being questioned. Vera is threatened, at gun-point, on her birthday. Stas asks Katya to convince his remaining squad members to save Vera.

Cast 

 Denis Shvedov as Stanislav "Stas" Khabarov, Moscow police detective, uses unorthodox methods. His wife, Vera asked him to move out of their flat.
 Evgeniya Brik as Vera Khabarova, police officer, suspected Stas of cheating.
 Angelina Zagrebina as Ekaterina "Katya" Savelieva, 18-year-old woman, first-year Psychology major at a Moscow college, able to see and hear Stas. She is prescribed Amitriptyline for major depressive disorder due to her parents' deaths. She also has a fear of heights.
 Sergey Belyaev as Victor Sergeevich Yegorov, detective squad boss, Stas and Vera's friend.
 Nadezhda Borisova as Ksyukha "Ksyu", detective, investigates a young woman's drug-related death.
 Evgeniy Kharitonov as Artur, detective, divorced, tries to romance Ksyu.
 Pavel Vorozhtsov as Dima, detective, married to Nastya, father of three, has a low arrest rate.
  as Aleksey Anatolievich "Lyosha" Samartsev, Vera's superior, Lilya's domestic partner but tries to romance Vera.
 Ivan Zlobin as Anton Sointsev, first-year Psychology major, befriends Katya, amateur hang musician.
 Safiya Yarullina as Dina, first-year Psychology major, briefly befriends Katya.
 Dan Rozin as Igor Garik Orlov ("Garik"), fifth-year college student, plies girlfriends with alcohol and drugs.
 Nikita Kologrivyy as Artyom, Igor's drinking buddy, druggie.
 Ilya Kremnev as Gypsy, major drug dealer, promotes synthetic drug "Rad".
 Tatyana Zhuravlyova as Ira ("Katya's aunt"), who raised Katya after her parents died in 2008.
 Ekaterina Strogova as Lilya, Lyosha's partner, disgruntled by his infatuation with Vera.
 Yana Irteneva as NN / Nadya "Nadin" Novikova, Stas' informant, stripper-prostitute.
  as Olga Dmitrieva "Olya" Savelieva ("Katya's mother"), widow of Ivan "Vanya" Saveliev, presumed dead in a 2008 house fire.
 Valeriya Krein as Sonya ("Vera's sister"), supports her after Stas' death.
 Kristina Yudicheva as Elena "Lena" Naumenko, 22-year-old, third-year college student. "Rad" overdose, corpse dumped in river.
 Elena Doronina as Tatiana Naumenko, Lena's mother, disputes drug-related suicide finding by police.
 Darya Kolpikova as Nastya, Dima's wife, mother of three.
 Olga Stashkevic as Anya, Artur's ex-wife, dumped by her lover, in intense pain awaiting surgery.
 Olesya Potashinskaya as Natalya Orlova, Igor's mother ("Garik's mother"), high-profile political candidate.
 Aleksandr Mizer as Dunya, major drug dealer, takes over Gypsy's operations, promotes "Rad".
 Nikolai Matchilskiy as Yura, another phantom, mentors Stas.
 Timofey Dunaev as "teacher", Psychology lecturer for Katya, Dina and Anton.
 Aleksey Yarmilko as "Stas' landlord", collects Stas' mail after his death.
 Denis Fomin as Reva ("criminal"), human trafficker, supplies brothels with young women, blackmails Dima.
 Andrey Smirennov as "criminal 2", van driver for Reva, gets arrested.
 Kristina Korbut as Rita, under-age prostitute.
 Ilya Gavrilenkov as "suicide ghost", Olya's rejected suitor, commits suicide, becomes a phantom, causes house fire, which kills Vanya.
 Denis Tkatchev as "strip club administrator", brothel manager, supplies Dima with under-age prostitutes.
 Kuzhakhmeg Begaliev as "cabbie", witnesses Lena with two men outside nightclub.

Episode guide

References

External links 

 

Television shows set in Russia
2020 Russian television series debuts
2020s Russian television series
Russian crime television series